George Alkiviades David  MFR (born 10 June 1937) is a Greek Cypriot-British entrepreneur and philanthropist. He is the chairman emeritus of the board of directors of Coca-Cola HBC AG,  after heading the organization for 35 years, and also currently chairman of the A. G. Leventis Foundation’s Greek Committee.

Early life and education

David was born in Petra, Cyprus, in 1937, to Alkiviadis David and Kalliope Leventis. There he received his first schooling, before moving to the English School in Nicosia (1949–1951). After attending Lindisfarne College in Wales (1951–1955) he graduated from the University of Edinburgh in 1959, obtaining the Degree of Bachelor of Commerce. In 1959, he began his career at the A. G. Leventis Organization in Nigeria, where he served as Group Director from 1967 to 1980. During his time in West Africa, he was active within the Greek and Cypriot expatriate community, and served as president of the Greek Community in Lagos. He married Kaity David (née Chordovatzi) in 1964, and together they had three children.

Career
Among other appointments, David served as chairman of the board of directors of Coca-Cola HBC AG from 1981 to 2016.
David was a Member of the Board of Titan Cement Co. SA from 2001 to 2013 and also served as chairman of the board of EFG Eurobank from 2013 to 2014,

From 1997 to 2010, he participated in the meetings of the Bilderberg Group as a steering committee member. A member of the board of the Hellenic Foundation for European and Foreign Policy (ELIAMEP) from 1999 to 2013, he is since an Honorary Committee member. He is also a member of the Brookings Institution’s International Advisory Council. He is Trustee of the A. G. Leventis Foundation and president of its Greek Committee since 1981. A co-founder of The Hellenic Initiative, David is one of the five entrepreneurs who established this non-profit, non-governmental organization with the aim of supporting Greece and Cyprus in the aftermath of the financial crisis, by helping to foster entrepreneurship in both countries. He is also a Member of Leadership 100.

David has supported the Center for Asia Minor Studies, and has acted as chairman of the center’s board since 2009, and is Emeritus Trustee of the Campion School in Athens (after serving as chairman of the board from 2000-2007) and a Regent of the University of Edinburgh. In 1989, he founded a scholarship programme in memory of his parents Alkiviadis and Kalliope supporting  gifted students from his hometown, Petra (part of occupied Cyprus since 1974). He has funded scholarships at Providence College since 1988, supporting students of Greek ethnicity, while, starting in 1992, a studentship with College Year in Athens annually offers a Tufts University student the chance to study Greek history and civilization, in the belief that such initiatives are "of paramount significance if we are to build, in the Platonic sense, a global society permeated by the values of humanism".,. David supports the University’s Edinburgh Center for Carbon Innovation in the pursuit of a low-carbon future. The George David Family Scholarships provide postgraduate students resident in Greece or Cyprus the opportunity to further their education at the ECCI, an institution that underlines that "education can be the first step towards re-shaping the world we live in."

Organic farming
David established the organically certified Atsas Farm – a dry-land agro ecology integrated system, which has focused in turning an arid, rocky landscape into a productive agro ecosystem, replicating, resilience of a natural ecosystem with the use of very limited water resources.  The organic products of V. Atsas Organic Products Ltd, in May 2017, won the Gold Award for High Phenolic Extra Virgin Olive Oil of The Olympia Health and Nutrition Awards.  Atsas Farm has an educational focus, providing courses on regenerative agriculture, which instruct participants in both theoretical and practical terms in sustainable farming and agro-ecological practices.

The George and Kaity David Foundation and V. Atsas Organic Products Ltd, also founded the Atsas Training Center, restoring the former Elementary School in the Skouriotissa Mining Settlement (originally constructed by the American Cyprus Mines Corporation) so that it could serve as educational center and a certified vocational training facility.

Awards and honours
In 2009, David was appointed Officer of the Order of the British Empire (OBE) for services to UK-Greek relations in the field of education. He received the Medal of the Order of the Federal Republic of Nigeria (MFR) for his services to the Nigerian nation in 2008. He is an Archon Maistor of the Ecumenical Patriarchate of Constantinople.

In 2013, David was awarded a doctorate honoris causa by the Faculty of Philology (School of Philosophy) of the National and Kapodistrian University of Athens. He received the Alba Business School Business Unusual Award the following year.  In 2015 he was elected Vice Chairman of the Council of the University of Cyprus, while in 2016, he was awarded an honorary doctorate by the Cyprus School of Molecular Medicine of the Cyprus Institute of Neurology and Genetics.

He was appointed Companion of the Order of St Michael and St George (CMG) in the 2021 Birthday Honours for services to the knowledge and understanding in the UK of the Greek and Hellenic worlds.

References

External links 
 A. G. Leventis Foundation 
 A. G. Leventis Gallery, Nicosia 
 Atsas Training Center 

20th-century Greek businesspeople
Alumni of the University of Edinburgh
Living people
Members of the Steering Committee of the Bilderberg Group
Place of birth missing (living people)
Greek expatriates in Nigeria
People educated at Lindisfarne College
Greek Cypriot people
Members of the Order of the Federal Republic
Officers of the Order of the British Empire
Organic farmers
20th-century Cypriot businesspeople
Coca-Cola people
1937 births
Companions of the Order of St Michael and St George
Naturalised citizens of the United Kingdom